I Hate You with a Passion is the second album by rapper Dre Dog (currently known as Andre Nickatina). It was released on April 19, 1995, on In-a-Minute Records and was produced by Dre Dog, T.C., Mark 5, the Enhancer, Reggie Smith, Race, and Rob V. One single was also released, titled "Situation Critical." This album was also Nickatina's last album billed as Dre Dog.

Track listing
"Muthafucka" (Ft. Cougnut) - 2:41
"Situation Critical" - 5:15 
"Powda 4 the Hoes" (Ft. Black C) - 4:11
"Killa Whale" - 4:37 
"Ike Turner" (Ft. Totally Insane) - 3:34
"Piece of My Mind" - 2:20 
"Hit It from the Back" - 3:31 
"Dirty Worm" - 4:51 
"Fillmoe" - 1:37 
"Killin' of the Caine" - 2:30 
"The Stress Factor" - 5:05 
"U Ain't My Folks" (Ft. Lo-Lo) - 3:10
"Mind Full of Hatred" - 4:03 
"Straight 2 the Point" - 2:39 
"A Diamond [Cocaine Murder Remix]" - 2:14

References

1995 albums
Andre Nickatina albums